Aleksei Viktorovich Frolikov (15 February 1957 in Moscow, Russian SFSR – 31 March 2020) was a Soviet/Latvian ice hockey player.

References

Soviet ice hockey forwards
HC Dynamo Moscow players
Soviet emigrants to Latvia
Dinamo Riga players
Latvian ice hockey players
1957 births
2020 deaths